Belogradchik Glacier is a 14 km long and 5.6 km wide glacier in the southern Aristotle Mountains on Oscar II Coast in Graham Land, Antarctica, situated south of Jeroboam Glacier and west of Ambergris Glacier.  It drains from the southeast slopes of Madrid Dome and flows southeastwards to join Flask Glacier east of Mount Fedallah.

The feature is named after the town of Belogradchik in northwestern Bulgaria.

Location

It was mapped by the British in 1976.

See also
 List of glaciers in the Antarctic
 Glaciology

Maps
 Antarctic Digital Database (ADD). Scale 1:250000 topographic map of Antarctica. Scientific Committee on Antarctic Research (SCAR). Since 1993, regularly upgraded and updated.

Notes

References
 Belogradchik Glacier SCAR Composite Antarctic Gazetteer
 Bulgarian Antarctic Gazetteer Antarctic Place-names Commission (Bulgarian)
 Basic data (English)

External links
 Belogradchik Glacier. Copernix satellite image

Glaciers of Oscar II Coast
Bulgaria and the Antarctic